Build-a-lot is a 2007 casual video game for Microsoft Windows.  The object of the game is to construct, upgrade and sell houses for profits. They can flip houses for quick cash or collect rent to make funds go up. Players help mayors from eight different areas and through 35 different levels to complete the game.  Build-a-lot was created by HipSoft. It has also been ported to Mac OS X by Red Marble Games. In 2009 it was ported to mobile phones, iOS systems and BlackBerry's by Glu Mobile. It was ported to the Nintendo eShop and DSI shop on August 18, 2011. In July 2013, Build-a-lot 3 and Build-a-lot 4: Power Source was ported to Android by Glu Mobile again

Game modes 
There are two game modes in Build-a-lot: career mode and casual mode.  In career mode, the object is to complete levels in which the player is assigned a set of tasks. In casual mode, the object is to meet a cash balance goal in the shortest time possible.

Career mode
In career mode, the player's object is to complete a set of tasks in an individual game scenario, or "level".  After doing so, they can advance to the next scenario.  Once a level is completed, that level is available for play to that player on a continuing basis.  Career mode has a total of thirty-five different levels, which are grouped together in  eight different "neighborhoods" of between three and five levels.  Each "neighborhood" has a different map character, number of lots, and different mayor.  The neighborhoods advance in terms of game complexity. New structures become available at higher levels, and goals become more difficult.

Meadow Dale is the tutorial neighborhood, in which the player is given the most basic tasks and is provided on-screen instructions for the game.  Levels 1, 2 and 3 are played in this neighborhood.  The "new" Mayor of Meadow Dale is Jennifer Russell.

Pleasant Valley is the first regular game neighborhood.  Levels 4, 5 and 6 are played in this neighborhood.  The Mayor of Pleasant Valley is Beatrice Hudson, who in the game is revealed to be a native of New England.

River Glen contains levels 7, 8, 9 and 10.  The Mayor of River Glen is Patrick O'Brien.

Evergreen Park hosts levels 11, 12, 13, 14, and 15 and its Mayor is Theodore Buckley III.

Lakeside is the setting for levels 16, 17, 18, 19 and 20 and its mayor is the bald Frank Crawford.

Granite Springs is the setting for levels 21, 22, 23, 24 and 25 and its mayor is the blonde Annie Stanton.  It's a western-style mountain community.

Summit Ridge is the penultimate neighborhood, where levels 26, 27, 28, 29 and 30 are played.  Summit Ridge is modeled as a skiing community, à la Jackson Hole or Aspen, Colorado.  The Mayor of Summit Ridge is Hans "The Wolf" Stallmire.

Palm Grove is the final neighborhood, where levels 31, 32, 33, 34 and 35 are played.  The Mayor of Palm Grove is Vince Danner, who claims to have been a "Hollywood Superstar".  Palm Grove is an island community (à la Hawaii), as Danner refers to the "Mainland".

Casual mode
In casual mode, the player's goal in each level is solely monetary—reaching a predetermined level of cash.  The player may achieve that goal using any strategy, and is not required to build any particular house or building.  However, in each casual mode game, the player is given only a starting cache of cash, workers, and materials.  Other than the smallest of the housing blueprints, the player must purchase the blueprint for any house or building the player would like to build.

Only six neighborhoods are available for play in casual mode, as opposed to the eight neighborhoods in career mode.  The six neighborhoods available in casual mode are the last six neighborhoods in career mode.

River Glen - The goal of River Glen in casual mode is $1,000,000.  The player begins with $100,000 in cash, four workers, and 500 materials.

Evergreen Park - The goal of Evergreen Park in casual mode is $2,500,000.  The player again begins with $100,000 in cash, four workers, and 500 materials.

Lakeside - The goal of Lakeside in casual mode is $5,000,000.  The player begins with $150,000 in cash, six workers and 750 materials.

Granite Springs - The goal of Granite Springs in casual mode is $10,000,000.  The player again (as in Lakeside) begins with $150,000 in cash, six workers and 750 materials.

Summit Ridge - The goal of Summit Ridge in casual mode is $25,000,000.  The player begins with $250,000 in cash, eight workers, and 1,000 materials.  There are eighteen total lots in the Summit Ridge neighborhood in casual mode.  At the start of a casual mode game,  one lot is occupied by an unowned Colonial, two lots are occupied by unowned Tudors, two lots are occupied by unowned Estates, one lot is occupied by an unowned Castle, and twelve lots are empty lots owned by the player.  One of the premium lots is occupied by the unowned Castle, and the other is occupied one of the unowned Estates.

Palm Grove - The goal of Palm Grove in casual mode in $50,000,000.  As in Summit Ridge, the player begins with $250,000 in cash, eight workers, and 1,000 materials.

Building types 
There are three main building types in the game, which can be used to help the player in various ways. These types are: 
 Houses
 Functional Buildings
 Cultural Buildings

Houses 
In Build-a-lot, there are six types of houses that can be built:

The Rambler is the lowest class house, a small-one story ranch-style house.  The Rambler "costs" 75 materials to build, and requires only one worker to build.  A rambler generates the lowest amount of rental income and sells at the lowest price in the game.  In the casual mode of the game, the Rambler blueprint is provided to the player at the beginning of play.
The Colonial is the second class of house.  It is in the style of a  Colonial house. The Colonial "costs" 150 materials to build and requires two workers to build.  In the Casual mode of the game, a player must purchase the Colonial blueprint, costing $30,000.
The Tudor is the third class of house and is in the style of a modern Tudor style.  A Tudor "costs" 300 materials and requires three workers to build.  In the Casual mode of the game, a player must purchase the Tudor blueprint for $60,000.
The Estate is the fourth class of house, a neoclassic or Greek revival estate home.  An Estate "costs" 600 materials and requires five workers to build.  The Estate home is often a critical building block of casual game strategy at higher levels.  In the casual mode of the game, a player must purchase the Estate blueprint for $120,000.
The Mansion is the fifth class of house. It is in the style of an American mansion.  A Mansion "costs" 1200 materials and requires seven workers to build.  In the casual mode of the game, a player must purchase the Mansion blueprint, costing $240,000.
The Castle is the largest house in the game and is in the Disney style castle in Disneyland.  A Castle "costs" 2500 materials and requires nine workers to build.  In the casual mode of the game, a player must purchase the Castle blueprint ($500,000).

Functional buildings 
Functional buildings assist the player in some aspect of completing a level or achieving a monetary goal, for example increasing revenue by generating interest (the Bank), or speeding up construction or repairs (the Workshop).  There are three functional buildings: the Sawmill, the Workshop, and the Bank.

In casual mode, each of the blueprints for the functional buildings costs $75,000.

The Sawmill  The Sawmill has three functions in Build-a-Lot:
 It reduces the prices of materials by 50%
 It speeds up the delivery of materials
 Allows players to purchase building "permits" that allow players to upgrade houses to 4-star houses.  A Sawmill "costs" 900 materials and five workers to build.

There is no benefit provided for having multiple sawmills.

The Workshop  The Workshop has three functions: 
 Reduces the price of "training" workers by 50%
 Speeds up the construction, upgrading, and repair of houses and buildings
 Allows players to perform "inspections" that serve to prevent houses from needing repairs.  A Workshop "costs" 900 materials and three workers to build.

In the casual mode of the game, the Workshop is important, as it allows players to speed up the construction and upgrading of houses, reducing the time necessary to generate cash.

There is no benefit for having multiple workshops.

The Bank has two functions: 
 Generates interest on the amount of money in the player's account, at the rate of 10% per interest period
 If "donated", it does not generate interest, but prevents a player from being responsible for paying property taxes.

Having multiple banks increases the amount of money generated for the player.  However, the amount of interest earned does not increase on a linear basis, i.e., each Bank will not generate 10% interest on the player's money.  Instead, the game acts to distribute the player's money evenly in each Bank, allowing a greater total rate of interest in the Banks, so there is an overall compound interest effect.  As an example, if the player has a total cash balance of $1,000,000 and two Banks, $500,000 will be deposited in each Bank.   The first Bank would generate 6% ($60,000) in interest, raising the total cash amount to $1,060,000.  The second Bank would generate 6% interest ($63,600) on half that amount ($530,000) to raise the total amount in the player's account to $1,102,500.  If the player has three Banks rather than two, each bank generates 4% interest on the player's money.  Accordingly, while the difference between one Bank and two Banks is substantial in that two Banks will produce more than 20% more interest than one Bank on its own, the addition of a third Bank does not appreciably add to the interest generated and takes up funds that could otherwise be used for house construction.

CostMart is a building unlocked if the player completes all levels of the career mode of the game at a "high efficiency" or "star" level.  It may be used in re-playing levels of the career mode, where it provides "profit-sharing"—a trickle of cash—and a trickle of free materials.  It seems not to be available during the casual mode of the game.

Cultural buildings
Cultural buildings are relevant to the career mode of the game, and are frequently the goals of particular levels.

The various cultural buildings are often tied to the personal interests of the Mayors, and also tie into the special gift given to the builder once a city is complete. For each city, the cultural buildings (and tie-in special gifts) are:

Meadow Dale — none
Pleasant Valley — Post Office (tie-in gift, rare stamps)
River Glen — library (tie-in gift, rare book)
Evergreen Park — (tie-in gift, golden money clip)
Lakeside — (tie-in gift, precision woodcraft tool kit)
Granite Springs — fire station, Western museum (tie-in gift, set of silver spurs)
Summit Ridge — ice rink (tie-in gift, skiing gold medal)
Palm Grove — surf shop, cinema, marina (tie-in gift, Best Actor award)

Reception & awards
Build-a-lot was the #1 Action/Arcade game of 2007 on Big Fish Games.  Build-a-lot was Casual-Game-of-the-Week at killerbetties.com, who highlighted the simple but smooth and pleasing animation, sound effects and surprisingly fun micromanagement.  It was rated 4.5 out of 5 stars by Yahoo! Games users.

It was named Big Fish Games "Action/Arcade Game of the Year", and RealArcade named it "Strategy Game of the Year".  It was nominated for the Interactive Achievement Awards for 2008 Downloadable Game of the Year.

Sequels
A sequel to Build-a-lot was released in April 2008.  It is called Build-a-lot: Town of the Year.  According to reviews, it  allows players to build parks and stores.  It  requires more micro-managing as players will not only build stores, but manage their inventories and appearance.  It  removes several elements of Build-a-lot gameplay and replaces them with new elements.  For example, premier properties are gone and a "curb appeal" feature is added where houses can be painted and landscaped to increase desirability and property value.

A second sequel, Build-a-lot 3: Passport to Europe was released in 2008.  In it, players travel to several European nations and build a variety of improvements, including landmarks and European-style houses. It retains most of the elements of the previous two games, but adds some new options, such as restoring run-down buildings. It reinstates the premier lots from the first version, but these are much less often relevant to play. Like the previous two games, it is available via several casual game distributors, as well as HipSoft's own website.

Another sequel, Build-a-lot 4: Power Source, was made available for download in August, 2009.  It includes a "power" resource, requiring players to build neighborhoods that do not exceed their power availability.

Build-a-lot: Monopoly edition was released on the 2nd September 2009 and is based on Build-a-lot but does include facilities such as hotels and train stations. Also, instead of having fictitious neighborhoods or cities like the original Build-a-lot and Build-a-lot 2, the game uses the properties on the standard Monopoly game board. Also, instead of dollars being used, all values are measured in Monos.

Build-a-lot: The Elizabethan Era was released in 2010. Set in Elizabethan England, the player manages farms and livestock in addition to real estate and deals with problems like vermin infestation. A Premium Edition was made available that included additional levels and property, as well as a strategy guide and behind-the-scenes material. The "host" of the game is of course, none other than Queen Elizabeth herself.

Build-a-lot: On vacation came out on September 7 of 2011.

Build-a-lot: Fairy Tales came out in 2012.

Build-a-lot: Mysteries came out in 2013.

Build-a-lot: Mysteries 2 and Build-a-lot World came out in 2014.

Build-a-lot: Big Dreams came out in 2020.

References

External links
 Build-a-lot page at HipSoft

2007 video games
Casual games
BlackBerry games
IOS games
MacOS games
Mobile games
Nintendo DS games
Windows games
Android (operating system) games
Simulation video games
Video games developed in the United States
Glu Mobile games
Single-player video games
Red Marble Games games
MumboJumbo games